The siege of Basra, code-named Operation Karbala-5 or The Great Harvest, was an offensive operation carried out by Iran in an effort to capture the Iraqi port city of Basra in early 1987. This battle, known for its extensive casualties and ferocious conditions, was the biggest battle of the war and proved to be the last major Iranian offensive. The Iranians failed to reach their objective.

The battle 

Operation Karbala-5 began midnight 8 January 1987, when a strike force of 35,000 Revolutionary Guards infantrymen crossed Fish Lake, while four Iranian divisions attacked at the southern shore of the lake, overrunning the Iraqi forces and capturing Duaiji, an irrigation canal. They used their bridgehead at Duaiji as a springboard. Between 9–10 January, the Iranians broke through the first and second defense lines of Basra south of the Fish Lake with tanks. The Iranians rapidly reinforced their forces with 60,000 troops and began to clear the remaining Iraqis in the area.

As early as 9 January, the Iraqis began a counter-attack, supported by newer Su-25 and Mig-29 aircraft and by 10 January the Iraqis were throwing every available heavy weapon in a bid to eject the Iranians. Despite being outnumbered 10–1 in the air, Iran's air defenses downed many Iraqi aircraft (45 jets in total), allowing Iran to provide close air support with their smaller air force, which also proved superior in dogfighting, causing the Iraqis to temporarily stop providing their troops air support. Iraqi tanks floundered in the marshland and were defeated by Cobra helicopters and TOW missile-equipped anti-tank commandos. Later in the battle, after their ground forces took heavy losses due to the lack of air support, the Iraqi aircraft came back to the battlefield once again, facing their Iranian counterparts.

Despite superior Iranian infantry tactics, it was the depth of the Iraqi defences that prevented the Iranians from achieving a victory. On 19–24 January, Iran launched another infantry offensive, breaking the third line and driving the Iraqis across the Jasim river. The battle became a contest of which side could bring more reinforcements. By 29 January, the Iranians launched a new attack from the west of the Jasim river, breaking through the fourth line. They were within  of the city. At this point, the battle became a stalemate. Iranian TV broadcast footage of the outskirts of Basra but the Iranians pushed no further. Iranian losses were so severe that Iraq took the offensive and pushed them back, containing the Iranians to the Shalamjah area. The fighting continued and 30,000 Iranians still held positions around Fish Lake. The battle bogged down into a trench war, where neither side could displace the other. Iran attacked several more times but without success. Karbala-5 officially ended by the end of February but the fighting and siege of Basra continued.

Among those killed was Iranian commander Hossein Kharrazi as well as the commander of 9th Division "Badr" Esmail Daghayeghi. Roughly 65,000 Iranians and 20,000 Iraqis became casualties because of Operation Karbala-5. The fighting during this operation was the heaviest and bloodiest during the war, with the area around Shalamcheh becoming known as the "Somme of the Iran-Iraq War". At one point, the situation had so worsened that Saddam ordered several of his officers to be executed. With Iranian aircraft concentrated at Basra, the Iraqis bombed Iranian supply routes with chemical weapons, as well as Iranian cities with conventional bombs, including Tehran, Isfahan and Qom. It is believed that around 3,000 Iranian civilians were killed in these attacks. Iran retaliated by firing eleven long-range missiles at Iraqi cities, inflicting casualties among civilians and killing at least 300.

The Iraqis had fought an excellent defensive battle at Basra, as they had at succeeded in fighting the Iranians to a complete standstill thwarting their obsession with capturing the city. The end of the battle saw a considerable breakdown of Iranian morale as hereafter only a small percent signed up for volunteering in the fanatical revolutionary guards or basij.

Bibliography
 The Great War for Civilisation: The Conquest of the Middle East, by Robert Fisk, Knopf Books, 2005
 "The Gulf Iran Strikes on Two Fronts", by William E. Smith, Time, 26 January 1987
 "The Gulf", Time, 2 February 1987
 "The Gulf Life Among Smoldering Ruins", by Dean Fischer, Time, 30 March 1987
 In The Name of God: The Khomeini Decade, by Robin Wright, Simon and Schuster, 1989
 Essential Histories: The Iran–Iraq War, 1980–1988, by Efraim Karsh, Osprey Publishing, 2002
 Journey to Heading 270 Degrees, by Ahmad Dihqan and Paul Sprachman, Mazda Publishers, 2006
 The Longest War, by Dilip Hiro, Routlage Chapman & Hall, 1991.
 http://csis.org/files/media/csis/pubs/9005lessonsiraniraqii-chap08.pdf 
 https://books.google.com/books?id=dUHhTPdJ6yIC&printsec=frontcover&source=gbs_atb#v=onepage&q&f=false

References

External links
 https://www.nytimes.com/1987/02/07/world/iraq-said-to-gain-upper-hand-at-basra.html

1987 in Iraq
Sieges involving Iran
Sieges involving Iraq
Basra
January 1987 events in Asia
February 1987 events in Asia
History of Basra
Military operations involving chemical weapons during the Iran–Iraq War
Battles involving Iraq
Battles involving Iran